Myrmoxenus gordiagini is a species of slave-making ant in the genus Myrmoxenus. It is found in Croatia and Russia. Its natural habitat is temperate forests.

References

Myrmicinae
Insects described in 1902
Taxonomy articles created by Polbot